Salpasilichho is a rural municipality (गाउँपालिका) out of seven rural municipalities of Bhojpur District of Province No. 1 of Nepal. There are a total of 9 municipalities in Bhojpur in which 2 are urban and 7 are rural.

To form this new Rural Municipality Dobhane, Khatamma, Chaukidanda and Kulunga were merged, which previously were Village development committee (local level administrative villages). Fulfilling the requirement of the new Constitution of Nepal 2015, Ministry of Federal Affairs and Local Development replaced all old VDCs and Municipalities into 753 new local level body (Municipality).

Chaukidanda is the Headquarter of this newly formed rural municipality.

References

External links
 Official website

Rural municipalities in Koshi Province
Populated places in Bhojpur District, Nepal
Rural municipalities of Nepal established in 2017
Rural municipalities in Bhojpur District